The Maywood Fire Department Building, at 511 St. Charles Rd. in Maywood, Illinois, was built in 1904.  It was listed on the National Register of Historic Places in 1992.

It has Dutch Revival architecture, including a stepped gable.  It was the Village of Maywood's first public fire station and was used until the early 1980s.  Later used as a residence, it retains its original fire pole inside.

References

Fire stations on the National Register of Historic Places in Illinois
Buildings and structures on the National Register of Historic Places in Cook County, Illinois
Late 19th and Early 20th Century American Movements architecture
Fire stations completed in 1904